Lord & Burnham was a noted American boiler and greenhouse manufacturer, and builders of major public conservatories in the United States.

History
The company began in 1849 when Frederick A. Lord, a carpenter, started building wood and glass greenhouses for neighbors in Buffalo, New York. It became Lord's full-time profession in 1856 as production moved to Syracuse, New York and then to Irvington, New York to be closer to his customers in the large Hudson River estates. In 1872 Lord's son-in-law William Addison Burnham joined the firm. Their first major commission came in the 1876 when California philanthropist James Lick hired the firm to create a  conservatory similar to that in Kew Gardens. Its parts were fabricated in New York and shipped to California by boat around Cape Horn. Lick died before the greenhouse could be constructed, but the materials were used to build the Conservatory of Flowers in San Francisco's Golden Gate Park.

In 1881 the firm constructed the first steel-framed curvilinear greenhouse in the United States for railroad magnate Jay Gould, on a property now open as Lyndhurst. In 1883 the partnership incorporated as Lord's Horticultural Manufacturing Company, and in 1890 the name was changed to today's Lord & Burnham Company.

Beginning in 1894, the company purchased underwater property beyond the tracks in Irvington and began filling in to create new land for an expansion. The expansion complex was completed by 1912, at which time the company employed 250 men.

The company used the property as additional factory space in the production process of their greenhouses. By 1988, only about a dozen employees remained at the Irvington factory, and Lord and Burnham ceased to exist when the factory closed in that year.

1989 Acquisition
Lord & Burnham's product line was acquired in 1989 by the Under Glass Manufacturing Co., which continues to manufacture Lord & Burnham greenhouses and solariums.

Rough Brothers also derives products from the Lord & Burnham name and product line.

William Addison Burnham continued to make boilers and the company he founded, Burnham Commercial, continues to do so today.

Conservatories
The company's early greenhouses were made of cypress before switching to iron or steel. Although experimentation with aluminum began in 1932 with the United States Botanic Garden, commercial production was not economical until 1955.

Major Lord & Burnham conservatories include:

 Conservatory of Flowers, Golden Gate Park, San Francisco, California, 1878-1879, a wood-and-glass greenhouse
 Phipps Conservatory & Botanical Gardens, Schenley Park, Pittsburgh, 1892–1893
 Buffalo and Erie County Botanical Gardens, Buffalo, New York, 1895–1899
 New York Botanical Garden, 1899–1902
 Sonnenberg Gardens and Mansion State Historic Park, Canandaigua, New York, 1903–1915
 Reynolda Gardens, Wake Forest University, Winston-Salem, North Carolina 1912
 United States Botanic Garden, Washington, DC, 1933
 Volunteer Park Conservatory, Volunteer Park, Seattle, Washington, 1912
 Krohn Conservatory, Eden Park, Cincinnati, built 1933, restored by Lord & Burnham in 1966

Company archives and historic plans
The title to the company's archives was given to the Archives of the New York Botanical Garden in 1990, along with their historic architectural plans. The collection includes over 140,000 architectural plans for more than 7,000 glass structures.

Gallery

See also
Sonnenberg Gardens and Mansion State Historic Park

References

External links
 Buffalo Gardens.com: "Crystal Palaces" — article on Lord & Burnham.
 Guide to the Lord & Burnham Collection at the New York Botanical Garden - resource that contains general historic information about the company, as well as a searchable database of historic glasshouse plans

Greenhouses in the United States
Architects from Buffalo, New York
Landscape design history of the United States
Manufacturing companies based in New York (state)
Companies based in Buffalo, New York
Design companies established in 1849
Manufacturing companies established in 1849
Manufacturing companies disestablished in 1988
1849 establishments in New York (state)
1988 disestablishments in New York (state)
Defunct companies based in New York (state)